U.S. Manga or U.S. Manga Corps do Brasil was a Brazilian television show broadcast by Manchete TV in 1997.

1997 Brazilian television series debuts